Sandstone Ranch or Sand Stone Ranch, as it was first known, was listed on the United States National Register of Historic Places on April 2, 1976.  The ranch is within the boundaries of the Spring Mountain Ranch State Park and Red Rock Canyon National Conservation Area and sits below the Wilson Range.

History
The working cattle ranch was established in 1876 by Sergeant James B. Wilson and George Anderson. Over time it transformed from the working ranch to a retreat. Later owners included; Chester Lauck (1948), Vera Krupp (1955) and Howard Hughes.

References 

Ranches on the National Register of Historic Places in Nevada
National Register of Historic Places in Clark County, Nevada
Architecture of the Las Vegas Valley
Buildings and structures in Clark County, Nevada
Spring Mountains
Nevada State Register of Historic Places
Historic districts on the National Register of Historic Places in Nevada